Brendon Boyd Urie (born April 12, 1987) is an American singer, songwriter, and musician who is best known as former lead vocalist and frontman of Panic! at the Disco, being the only member to stay throughout the band's 19 year run.

In high school, his friends chose him to be the band's lead singer after initially considering him for the guitarist position. Many of his songs have achieved commercial success, reaching high spots on Billboard charts and millions of sales. He is known for his expansive four octave tenor vocal range.

Early life
Urie was born in St. George, Utah, and his family moved to Las Vegas, Nevada, when he was two years old. He is the fifth and youngest child born to Grace and Boyd Urie. He is of about one quarter Polynesian descent from Hawaii, through his mother's side. He was raised in an LDS family, but left the faith around 17 due to displeasure with the church and not believing in its ideology. Urie attended Palo Verde High School in Las Vegas, where he met future Panic! bassist Brent Wilson in his guitar class. Wilson asked Urie to try out for a band he was in, since they needed a replacement guitarist.

Urie described himself as a "spaz in high school," and explained that one student would always bully him. He worked at Tropical Smoothie Cafe in order to pay his band's rent for their practice space. At the cafe, Urie often sang for customers. He explained, "I would sing anything I was listening to at the time, but I was down to take requests. I remember singing some Scorpions songs, some W.A.S.P. 80s anthems are usually good for tips. It was a huge range of stuff. Some people liked it, and some people didn't. I had to respect other people's wishes, but I had a couple people come in who would ask me to sing for a tip. That's always fun." Urie graduated high school in 2005.

Career

Panic! at the Disco

Urie met Brent Wilson while taking guitar classes offered at their high school and Wilson asked Urie to try out as lead guitarist for Panic! at the Disco, as they were looking for a replacement at the time. Originally, Ryan Ross was their lead singer. When Urie filled in for Ross during a band rehearsal, they were impressed with Urie's vocal abilities and he was chosen as their lead singer. He officially joined the band in 2004.

Since then, Panic! at the Disco has released seven studio albums with Urie as lead vocalist. A Fever You Can't Sweat Out was released in 2005 with the hit lead single "I Write Sins Not Tragedies" propelling it to 1.8 million sales. For their second album, Pretty. Odd. (2008), Urie also took lyrical responsibility and wrote two of the tracks on the record by himself; those tracks being "I Have Friends in Holy Spaces" and festival favorite "Folkin' Around". He also wrote "New Perspective" for the soundtrack to the motion picture Jennifer's Body.

On March 22, 2011, the band released their third album Vices & Virtues following the departure of Ross and Walker. On October 8, 2013, the fourth album, Too Weird to Live, Too Rare to Die! was released. It debuted at No. 2 on the Billboard 200. On July 21, 2014, Urie won "Best Vocalist" at the Alternative Press Music Awards. In 2015, founding drummer Spencer Smith left the band and bassist Dallon Weekes departed from the official lineup, being downgraded to a touring member, leaving Urie as the only member of the official lineup.

On January 15, 2016, Panic! at the Disco released their fifth studio album, Death of a Bachelor, eventually earning the band its best sales week and first number one album.

On March 21, 2018, the band released two new songs "Say Amen (Saturday Night)" and "(Fuck A) Silver Lining". At the same time, the band also announced a tour, and a new album called Pray for the Wicked.

On June 6, 2022, Panic! At The Disco announced their seventh studio album "Viva Las Vengeance", and released the title single along with announcing a tour. 

On January 24, 2023, Urie announced that he would be discontinuing Panic! At The Disco in order to focus on his family following the conclusion of the Viva Las Vengeance Tour.

Other projects
Urie provided guest vocals alongside Patrick Stump on The Cab's song "One Of THOSE Nights" from their debut album, Whisper War.

Urie has also been involved with several songs and other projects by former labelmates Fall Out Boy. He provided vocals on the songs "What a Catch, Donnie" and "20 Dollar Nose Bleed" from Fall Out Boy's 2008 album, Folie à Deux. Urie also sang back vocals on the track "7 Minutes In Heaven" off of Fall Out Boy's From Under The Cork Tree.

In 2008, Urie became involved with a song for the Coca-Cola Company, called "Open Happiness". Urie sings the chorus of the song, which also features labelmate Patrick Stump of Fall Out Boy, labelmate Travis McCoy of Gym Class Heroes, Cee-Lo Green, and Janelle Monáe. The song was written and produced by Butch Walker, co-written by Cee-Lo Green and remixed by Polow Da Don. Urie was also featured as an elated news reporter in the music video for the song, which was released on July 16, 2009.

In December 2013, Urie sang "Big Shot" in front of Billy Joel, President Obama and an audience, when Billy Joel received the Kennedy Center Honors, the nation's highest honor for influencing American culture through the arts.

Urie appeared in the music videos "A Little Less Sixteen Candles, a Little More Touch Me," "What A Catch, Donnie" and "Headfirst Slide into Cooperstown on a Bad Bet" by Fall Out Boy. Urie appears in the Gym Class Heroes video for the song "Clothes Off!!" alongside former Panic! at the Disco band members Ryan Ross, Spencer Smith and Jon Walker. The members are seen dancing in animal costumes, Urie being in a dog suit. Urie also appears in "One of THOSE nights" by The Cab, which also features Ryan Ross, Jon Walker, Pete Wentz, Patrick Stump and Spencer Smith. In 2010 Urie and bandmate Spencer Smith appeared in Butch Walker's music video "Pretty Melody", appearing as ninjas. Brendon co-wrote a song with Rivers Cuomo of the band Weezer. Rivers has said that "If Panic! wants it, they have first dibs, but if not, it could work for Weezer." Urie and bandmate Spencer Smith appeared in Butch Walker's Panic! at Butch Walker's, a parody in which Urie discovers Walker is a psychotic homicidal cannibal, and Brendon is his next meal.

On March 24, 2014, Brendon Urie was featured on Travie McCoy's single "Keep On Keeping On" off his upcoming album Rough Waters. Urie featured on the entirety of the song "Love in the Middle of a Firefight" for Dillon Francis's album Money Sucks, Friends Rule. Francis called it his favorite track on the album. Urie also was featured on the Lil Dicky track "Molly" on his debut studio album Professional Rapper.

In 2016, Urie was featured on the song "It Remembers" by the band Every Time I Die, from their album Low Teens.

On April 11, 2017, Urie announced that he would star in Cyndi Lauper's Tony Award-winning Broadway musical, Kinky Boots, in which he played one of the lead roles, Charlie Price. He played the role from May 26, 2017, to August 6, 2017.

In 2015, Urie wrote a song for the SpongeBob SquarePants musical. The musical made its debut in Chicago in the summer of 2016 and returned to the Palace Theater on Broadway in the winter of 2017. For the musical, Urie wrote a song called, "Not A Simple Sponge". Nickelodeon released a video in the spring of 2016 that includes details about the artists that they worked with to bring the score to life, including Aerosmith, John Legend, Plain White T's and Panic! at the Disco.

In June 2018, Urie launched the Highest Hopes Foundation.  The foundation supports other non-profit organizations that advocate for human rights and support communities who are often discriminated against.  To start off the funding of this foundation, Urie donated $1 million and gave $1 from the purchase of every US ticket for the Pray for the Wicked Tour to the foundation.

On April 26, 2019, Urie collaborated with singer Taylor Swift on "Me!" which is the lead single of her seventh studio album, Lover. They wrote the song with Joel Little. Swift and Little produced the song. This song obtained commercial success, reaching No. 2 on the Billboard Hot 100, and it also charted in many other countries including the United Kingdom, Canada, Australia and New Zealand.

Voice 
Urie's tenor voice is extensive; his vocal range spans nearly five octaves (from D2 to C7).

Influences 
Urie has cited Frank Sinatra, Queen, David Bowie, and Tom DeLonge as his biggest influences. He also cited Taylor Swift as his influence as a songwriter.

Personal life

Urie married Sarah Orzechowski on April 27, 2013, after announcing their engagement in September 2011. The two had first briefly met at one of Urie's shows, while Orzechowski was in a relationship. Eight months later, Hayley Williams from the band Paramore brought Sarah to another of Urie's shows and re-introduced them, and they began dating in 2009. The song "Sarah Smiles" from the album Vices & Virtues was inspired by Orzechowski.

In 2013, Urie said that he had "experimented" with men but stated, "I guess if I had to classify myself, I'd say I'm straight." In July 2018, Urie described himself as pansexual and stated, "I'm married to a woman and I'm very much in love with her but I'm not opposed to a man because to me, I like a person. [...] If a person is great, then a person is great."

In a 2016 interview with Rolling Stone, Urie stated that he has synesthesia.

In February 2017, Urie moved from his home in Los Angeles to an undisclosed location, stating that "visits and constant harassment" from fans approaching him at his house led him to feel unsafe.

Urie has said that he has been diagnosed with ADHD and was prescribed medication for the condition at a young age. He says that he likes to be open about his mental health to his fans.

Urie joined Twitch on September 30, 2015.  As of January 2023, his streams had accrued more than 4 million views.

On January 24, 2023, Brendon revealed that he and his wife were expecting a child together, and that he would be discontinuing Panic! at the Disco in order to focus on his family.

Discography

Singles

As featured artist

Promotional singles

Guest appearances

Notes

References

External links

 
 Official Panic! at the Disco web site

1987 births
21st-century American singers
American atheists
American male guitarists
American male singer-songwriters
American multi-instrumentalists
American people of Native Hawaiian descent
American rock guitarists
American rock singers
American rock songwriters
American tenors
Former Latter Day Saints
Guitarists from Nevada
LGBT Latter Day Saints
LGBT people from Nevada
LGBT people from Utah
American LGBT singers
Living people
Native Hawaiian musicians
Panic! at the Disco members
Pansexual musicians
Pansexual men
People from the Las Vegas Valley
Singers with a four-octave vocal range
Palo Verde High School alumni
Twitch (service) streamers
Singer-songwriters from Nevada
Singer-songwriters from Hawaii